OshKosh B'gosh is an American children's apparel company founded in Oshkosh, Wisconsin. It is a subsidiary of Carter's.

The company was founded in 1895 as the Grove Manufacturing Company by Frank E. Grove, J. Howard Jenkins, and James Clark. Grove was soon bought out of the company and it was renamed Oshkosh Clothing and Manufacturing Co. in December 1896. OshKosh B'gosh's most notable product was hickory striped overalls. The term "B'gosh" began being used in 1911, after general manager William Pollock heard the tagline "Oshkosh B'Gosh" in a vaudeville routine in New York. The company formally adopted the name OshKosh B'gosh in 1937.

OshKosh B'gosh has become best known for its children's clothing, especially bibbed overalls. The original children's overalls, dating from the early 20th century, were intended to let parents dress their children like their fathers. According to the company, sales of the product increased after Miles Kimball, an Oshkosh-based mail order catalog, featured a pair of the overalls in its national catalog in 1960. As a result, OshKosh began to sell their products through department stores and expanded their children's line.

Children's clothing made up just less than 50 percent of the company's sales in 1980; by 1984 that number had grown to about 80 percent.

OshKosh B'Gosh's Wisconsin plant was closed in 1997. Downsizing of domestic operations and massive outsourcing and manufacturing at Mexican and Honduran subsidiaries saw the domestic manufacturing share drop below 10 percent by the year 2000.

OshKosh B'Gosh was sold to Carter's, another clothing manufacturer, in 2005 for $312 million, though it still operates under the original name.

Today the company sells accessories, jeans, pants, shirts, sweaters, t-shirts, tank tops, and its trademark overalls. The company produces clothing for babies, infants, toddlers, kids (4–7), and youth (5–14); however, it no longer manufactures clothing in adult sizes. The company also has over 300 stores in the United States.

The company is headquartered in Phipps Tower in Atlanta's Buckhead district.

References

External links
 

1895 establishments in Wisconsin
2005 mergers and acquisitions
American companies established in 1895
American corporate subsidiaries
Children's clothing brands
Clothing brands of the United States
Clothing companies established in 1895
Manufacturing companies based in Atlanta
Manufacturing companies based in Wisconsin
Oshkosh, Wisconsin
Retail companies established in 1895